This is a list of Polish refugees cemeteries in Africa. The list includes cemeteries of Polish refugees evacuated from the USSR in World War II.

Cemeteries in Africa

References

Lists of cemeteries
Africa-related lists
Refugees cemeteries in Africa